The Liederkranz hall is a historic building in Grand Island, Nebraska. It was built in 1911-1912 for the local Liederkranz, or German-language choir, founded in 1870. Moreover, "All
meetings, programs, etc. were conducted in German until World War I when English became the official language." The building was designed in the Classical Revival style by architect Oscar Kirche. It has been listed on the National Register of Historic Places since November 30, 1978. It is the only Liederkranz in Nebraska.

References

		
National Register of Historic Places in Hall County, Nebraska
Neoclassical architecture in Nebraska
Buildings and structures completed in 1911
German-American culture in Nebraska